Caledonians F.C. may refer to several association football teams:

Existing clubs
Inverness Caledonian Thistle F.C.

Defunct clubs
Caledonian F.C.
London Caledonians F.C.
Liverpool Caledonians F.C.